Rafael Tadeo (born 28 September 1949) is a Mexican long-distance runner. He competed in the marathon at the 1972 Summer Olympics.

References

1949 births
Living people
Athletes (track and field) at the 1975 Pan American Games
Athletes (track and field) at the 1972 Summer Olympics
Mexican male long-distance runners
Mexican male marathon runners
Olympic athletes of Mexico
Place of birth missing (living people)
Pan American Games competitors for Mexico
20th-century Mexican people